I'billin is a local council in the Northern District of Israel, near Shefa-'Amr. 'Ibillin was granted municipal status in 1960. The municipality's area is 18,000 dunams.

History

Archaeological excavations in the centre of the village has indicated a continuous inhabitation from the Iron Age (9th century BCE) to the Mamluk Sultanate period (14th century CE).

Nasir Khusraw visited the place in 1047 C.E.: "From Damum we passed south to another village, called A'bilin, where there is the tomb of Hud - peace be upon him! - which I visited. Within the enclosure here is a mulberry tree, and there is likewise the tomb of the prophet Uzair - peace be upon him! - which I also visited."

Ottoman Empire 
In 1760, a traveller between Acre and Nazareth noted "the castle of Abelin, on a beautiful eminence; and a town close to it, which is governed by Joseph Omar, brother of the chief of Acre", by the latter meaning Zahir al-Umar. The castle, still standing in the town, is probably from the eighteenth century.

In 1799, I'billin was marked Obellin on Jacotin's map surveyed during Napoleon's invasion.

In 1848, William F. Lynch met there Aqil Agha, and made him their guide for an American expedition to the River Jordan. The population in 1859 was stated by British consul Edward Thomas Rogers to have been 800 souls, and the tillage fifty feddans.

In 1875, the French explorer Victor Guérin visited the village. He estimated the population at 600, divided equally between Moslems and "Greek Christians", the latter subdivided into Melkite and Greek Orthodox Christians. He noted that the latter had a church dedicated to St. George.

In 1881, the PEF's Survey of Western Palestine (SWP) described it as "A village on high ground with gardens beneath it on the south, and a spring ('Ain 'Afieh) about half a mile to the south. There is a minaret to the mosque which is a conspicuous object." According to an Arabic inscription on the mosque, the construction of the mosque and the remains of a fortification in the village are credited to Yusef el-Omar, a Zaydani family member and brother of the 18th century ruler of the Galilee, Zahir al-Umar. According to the SWP, "The houses in the village are principally of stone; wells occur south of the hill, with olives near them. Some of the inhabitants are Greek Christians."

The village is of special importance to Catholics as the birthplace of Mariam Baouardy, who was beatified by Pope John Paul II in 1983 and canonized by Pope Francis in 2015. Saint Mariam Bawardi is considered as one of the two first Palestinian saints, the other being Marie-Alphonsine Danil Ghattas.

Aqil Agha built a fortress in Ibillin. He is buried in the village, as is the family of Dhaher el-Omar.

A population list from about 1887 showed that Abelin had about 745 inhabitants; 400 Greek Catholic Christians, 70 Catholic Christians, 30 Latin Christians and 245 Muslims.

British Mandate 
In the 1922 census of Palestine conducted by the British Mandate authorities, I'billin had 528 Christians and 289 Muslims, a total population of 817. Of the Christians, 410 were Orthodox, 111 Melkite and 7 Anglican. In the 1931 census  'Arab El Hujeirat was counted together with I'billin, and the census found 663 Christians and 453 Muslims, a total 1116 persons, in 192 houses.

In the  1945 statistics the population of I'billin was 1,660; 1,060 Christians and 600 Muslims, who owned 18,632 dunams of land according to an official land and population survey. 2,367 dunams were plantations and irrigable land, 8,628 used for cereals, while 95 dunams were built-up (urban) land.

Israel 
I'billin was captured by the Israeli army during the first phase of Operation Dekel, 8–14 July 1948. Most of the Muslim population were expelled and replaced by Christians from neighbouring villages. The town was regularly searched for people who were not registered in the November 1948 census. On 8 January 1949 villagers from I'billin were amongst a group of 128 men, women and children, who were expelled into the West Bank at 'Ara. The town remained under martial law until 1966.

Education

In 1965 Abuna Elias Chacour, an Arab Christian from Kafr Bir'im, later Archbishop of Galilee, established a school open to all local children, regardless of religious affiliation. This developed into the Mar Elias Educational Institutions, an educational complex consisting of a kindergarten, elementary school, junior high school, high school. And formerly used to include a college and a university. The educational complex is located on Jabal al-Ghoul (Hill of Demons), on property belonging to the Melkite Church. The hill has been renamed Jabal al-Nour (Hill of Light).

"Mar Elias University" was established in 2003, claiming to be the first Arab university in Israel, though it is not officially holding a University status. It is recognized by the Council for Higher Education in Israel as a campus and operates as a branch of the University of Indianapolis in the United States. But the Israeli government ordered its closure hence it was turned into Mar Elias High School, part of the Mar Elias Educational Institutions.

Economy
Ibillin historically depended on agriculture, especially the growth of sheets and vegetables (most notably cucumbers). Ibillin is also one of only municipalities in Israel that are allowed to raise pigs and to house pig farms on its land and it exports to multiple Arab Christian and Russian restaurants and factories all throughout Israel who sell pork products (most notably the Russian "Marcel Brothers - אחים מרסל" company based in Haifa).

Ibillin also relies on tourism to the Daoud Courtyard Open Air Museum, where one can visit the house of Saint Mariam Bawardi.

Notable businesses in Ibillin:

Naser Recycling ( "Naser Company for Waste Recycling",), the only privately owned waste management company in Israel. Based in Ibillin, it owns and operates a waste handling complex (located in Ibillin) that includes a municipal solid waste separation plant, a compost plant, a landfill and an electricity generator powered by the methane gas generated by the waste. The company also used to formerly operate a landfill located in Hatzor HaGlilit. The company is owned by Samir Naser Daoud and is one of few automatic waste separation plants in the Middle East operated by Arabs.
Mar Elias Educational Institutions: educational complex consisting of a kindergarten, elementary school, junior high school, high school. The Institution is owned by Abuna Elias Chacour.
Daoud Courtyard : One of the last heritage complexes in the Galilee villages. The complex is 120 years old and includes the house of Saint Mariam Bawardi, the Daoud family house and garden (one of the first and oldest buildings still standing in Ibillin built during the British Mandate of Palestine), and a Palestinian olive oil press.
Shaheen Honey.

Notable people

 Aqil Agha (c. 1820–1870), Galilean strongman
 Mariam Baouardy (1846–1878), Catholic saint
 Elias Chacour (born 1939) Former Archbishop of the Melkite Catholic Church for Akko, Haifa, Nazareth, and all Galilee
 Shawqi Habib (1929–2018), (:ar:شوقي_حبيب) Chemistry Teacher, Writer, Poet, First Arab to graduate from the Technion Israel Institute of Technology
 Saleh Saleem (born 1953), former politician
 Miriam Toukan (born 1982), singer

Gallery

See also
 Arab localities in Israel
Mariam Baouardy
Mar Elias Educational Institutions
Galilee

References

Bibliography

 

, London,

External links
Welcome To I'billin
Survey of Western Palestine, Map 5: IAA, Wikimedia commons
Local Council of Ibillin (Arabic)
Pilgrims of Ibillin (organization in the USA)
Daoud Courtyard, Ibillin Museum and location of the house of St. Mariam Baouardy.

Arab localities in Israel
Arab Christian communities in Israel
Local councils in Northern District (Israel)